David G. Drubin is an American biologist, academic, and researcher. He is a Distinguished Professor of Cell and Developmental Biology at the University of California, Berkeley where he holds the Ernette Comby Chair in Microbiology.

Drubin has published over 220 papers. His research spans the areas of cell biology, genetics, and biochemistry. The approaches employed for these studies include real-time imaging of live cells, genome editing, mathematical modeling, genetics, and biochemistry. His lab studies human stem cells, stem-cell derived organoids, Zebrafish, and budding yeast to elucidate the molecular mechanisms that underlie highly dynamic subcellular events.

Drubin is a Fellow of American Society for Cell Biology, and a Senior Fellow at the Allen Institute for Cell Science. He served as Editor-in-Chief for Molecular Biology of the Cell for 10 years, advocating for civil and constructive peer review. At the 2012 ASCB annual meeting in San Francisco he organized a meeting of journal editors to discuss the harmful effects of the Journal Impact Factor. This meeting produced the San Francisco Declaration on Research Assessment and earned the leaders of the effort SPARC Innovator Award recognition.

He was elected a member of the National Academy of Sciences in 2022.

Education
Drubin studied at the University of California, Berkeley, and the University of California, San Francisco, earning, respectively, his Bachelor's and Doctoral degrees in biochemistry in 1980 and Biochemistry and Biophysics in 1985. From 1985 until 1988, he held a Helen Hay Whitney Postdoctoral Fellowship at Massachusetts Institute of Technology (MIT).

Career
Following his Postdoctoral fellowship, Drubin was appointed as an Assistant Professor of Molecular and Cell Biology at the University of California, Berkeley in 1988. He was promoted to Associate Professor in 1994, and became Professor of Molecular and Cell Biology in 1998.

Research
Drubin's research utilizes live-cell imaging, genetics, modeling and biochemistry to address fundamental questions concerning the cytoskeleton and membrane trafficking events in budding yeast and genome-edited human stem cells.

Molecular and cell biology
While isolating the gene encoding microtubule-associated tau protein, a major player in Alzheimer's disease, Drubin developed cell culture models to study its biological function. He distilled general principles for cell polarity development while defining it as the ultimate reflection of complex mechanisms that establish and maintain functionally specialized domains in the plasma membrane and cytoplasm. In a paper published in 2001, he guided establishment of a protein interaction map for cell polarity development, and determined a network of interactions that provide an integrated response of signaling proteins, the cytoskeleton, and organelles to the spatial cues that direct polarity development.

Membrane trafficking and the cytoskeleton
Drubin studied mutants of over 60 proteins, identifying a pathway in budding yeast in which proteins are recruited to endocytic sites, and also identified several protein modules that provide distinct functions in this pathway. He extended these studies to mammalian cells, and determined the roles of these proteins in endocytosis and cell polarity development. In the early 2000s, he outlined examples of functional cooperation between the microtubule and actin cytoskeletons, and highlighted two broad categories in this context: coordinated MT- and actin-based transport to move vesicles, organelles, and cell fate determinants; and targeting and capture of MT ends at cortical actin sites.

Actin assembly
In his studies on actin assembly, Drubin demonstrated that although budding yeast are nonmotile, their actin filaments turn over at high rates and he defined the roles for actin in establishment and maintenance of cell polarity while using and popularizing the actin inhibitor latrunculin-A. He established that cofilin is largely responsible for actin filament high turnover rate. He conducted structure-function analysis of actin, described mutating residues involved in nucleotide hydrolysis, and also demonstrated the effects of these mutations on actin assembly in vitro and in vivo. His studies further addressed the role of nucleotide in Arp2/3 function, and highlighted several novel activators of the Arp2/3 complex, which regulates actin nucleation. He has also developed a complex actin assembly system on the surface of microbeads incubated in yeast cell extracts, and has extended this work toward reconstituting complex actin-based trafficking events on supported lipid bilayers.

Awards/honors
1985-1988 - Helen Hay Whitney Postdoctoral Fellowship
1990-1993 - Searle Scholar Award 
1994-1999 - Faculty Research Award, American Cancer Society
2006-2016 - MERIT Award, National Institutes of Health
2008 - Ira Herskowitz Award, Yeast Genetics and Molecular Biology Meeting 
2010 - Election to the American Academy of Arts and Sciences 
2013 - SPARC Innovator Award for SF Declaration on Research Assessment 
2016 - Awarded Ernette Comby Chair in Microbiology, UC Berkeley 
2016 - Lifetime Achievement Fellow, American Society for Cell Biology
2019 - Distinguished Service Award, American Society for Cell Biology
2022 - Election to the National Academy of Sciences

Bibliography
Drubin, D. G., & Kirschner, M. W. (1986). Tau protein function in living cells. Journal of Cell Biology, 103(6), 2739–2746.
Drubin, D. G., & Nelson, W. J. (1996). Origins of cell polarity. Cell, 84(3), 335–344.
Ayscough, K. R., Stryker, J., Pokala, N., Sanders, M., Crews, P., & Drubin, D. G. (1997). High rates of actin filament turnover in budding yeast and roles for actin in establishment and maintenance of cell polarity revealed using the actin inhibitor latrunculin-A. Journal of Cell biology, 137(2), 399–416.
Kaksonen M., Sun Y., Drubin D.G., (2003). A pathway for association of receptors, adaptors and actin during endocytic internalization Cell 115(4): 475–87.
Kaksonen M., Toret C.P., Drubin D.G., (2005). A modular design for the clathrin- and actin-mediated endocytosis machinery. Cell 123: 305–320.
Doyon J.B., Zeitler B., Cheng J., Cheng A.T., Cherone J.M., Santiago Y., Lee A.H., Vo T.D., Doyon Y., Miller J.C., Paschon D.E., Zhang L., Rebar E.J., Gregory P.D., Urnov F.D., & Drubin D.G. (2011). Rapid and efficient clathrin-mediated endocytosis revealed in genome-edited mammalian cells.  Nat Cell Biol 13(3): 331–7.

References

Externals links 
David G. Drubin on PubMed

Living people
American molecular biologists
University of California, Berkeley faculty
University of California, San Francisco alumni
University of California, Berkeley alumni
Year of birth missing (living people)
Members of the United States National Academy of Sciences